Hieracium stiptocaule, a name for a plant in the hawkweed genus Hieracium, is a synonym of two different species:

Hieracium canadense
Hieracium laevigatum

References 

stiptocaule